The Courtauld Talks is a live album by English post-punk band Killing Joke, released in 1989 by Invisible Records. It is different from the group's other releases in that it is essentially a spoken-word album.

Content 
On 19 September 1987, frontman Jaz Coleman delivered a lecture at London's Courtauld Institute, outlining the thinking behind the band's then-unreleased Outside the Gate album, expounding on its origins in gematria and the occult. Fellow Killing Joke member Geordie Walker (on acoustic guitar) and Outside the Gate session musician Jeff Scantlebury (on percussion) provided a minimal, repetitive musical backing. The venue itself was an apt place for the lecture as it specialised in arts and conservation.

Release 
A recording of the lecture was released as The Courtauld Talks, a double vinyl LP on Joke drummer Martin Atkins' Invisible Records in 1989. A CD version was released in July 1997.

Track listing 
 "The Courtauld Talks" – 66:22

Personnel 
 Killing Joke
 Jaz Coleman – voice
 Kevin "Geordie" Walker – acoustic guitar

 Additional personnel
 Jeff Scantlebury – percussion

 Technical
 Martin Rex - live sound & recording engineer
 Phil Le Gonidec - crew

References 

1989 live albums
Killing Joke albums